Tumhari Sulu is a 2017 Indian Hindi-language comedy-drama film written and directed by Suresh Triveni and produced by Bhushan Kumar, Tanuj Garg, Krishan Kumar, Atul Kasbekar and Shanti Sivaram Maini under the banners of T-Series and Ellipsis Entertainment.

Tumhari Sulu stars Vidya Balan as the titular character, an ambitious housewife who becomes a radio jockey for a late-night relationship advice show. Manav Kaul and Neha Dhupia co-star as Sulu's husband and boss, respectively. Tumhari Sulu was released worldwide on 17 November 2017, to become both a critical and a decent box office success which earned over 508.4 million on a 200 million budget. 

At the 63rd Filmfare Awards, Tumhari Sulu received 9 nominations, including Best Supporting Actor (Kaul), with Balan winning her fourth Best Actress award at the ceremony. It was remade in Tamil as Kaatrin Mozhi (2018) with Jyothika reprising Vidya's role.

Plot
Sulochana Dubey, nicknamed Sulu (Vidya Balan), is a middle-class housewife living in Virar with her family. She enjoys her life to the fullest with her husband Ashok (Manav Kaul) and 11-year-old son Pranav. Sulu dreams of being a working woman, but since she couldn't complete high school, she is unable to apply for white-collar jobs. Her elder twin sisters mock her, seeing Sulu as beneath them due to her education. Ashok works as a manager in a tailoring firm; a frustrating job as everyone apart from him is unreasonable and over the age of sixty. On top of that, the firm is taken over by the owner's grandson, who is extremely rude. Pranav is teased by a group of classmates who sell R-rated magazines and videos.

One day, Sulu wins a contest hosted by her favourite radio station and goes to the station to collect her prize. There, she sees a poster advertising auditions for an RJ, and feels that this is the job she is meant for. Sulu meets the boss, Maria (Neha Dhupia), who finds her extrovert nature intriguing and gives her an opportunity to audition. Sulu laughs throughout the audition but at the end, says 'Hello' in a sensual tone, which impresses Maria. Maria asks if Sulu would be able to do a call-in night show, where people would call her to talk about their problems and she agrees.

Ashok is irritated at first that Sulu took up the job without discussing with him but relents out of love for his wife. On her first day, Sulu faces an annoying caller who tries to change their chat into an obscene one, but is able to tactfully handle it. Next, she gets a request to sing, and excitedly does a song she only sings for her husband. Ashok is annoyed by her behavior, as well as frustrated with his new boss, who treats him terribly. Sulu's family disagree with her show and want her to quit but Ashok stands by her. The show becomes successful and Sulu enjoys her work, growing more worldly and confident. However, Ashok continues taking out his frustrations at home about both his job and hers. Sulu's life becomes high at work and low at home.

One day, the principal of Pranav's school reveals that he has been charging other kids for showing adult phone videos he stole from Ashok, as well as faking his father's signatures. Pranav is suspended from school, which becomes a serious issue at home. Sulu's sisters blame her, claiming that she has neglected her son because of her job and her low level of education is influencing him. They say she has to quit but Sulu takes a tough stand, rejecting their conditions. She later gets a call that Pranav is missing. Sulu and Ashok find a note by him, revealing he is ashamed of what he has done and is sad that his mother had to leave her job because of him. Pranav requests his father to support his mother and her work. Ashok and Sulu reconcile as they search for their son.

The police find Pranav the next day and bring him home. Sulu resigns from the show, feeling that she is not able to handle the conflict it is causing at home. As she leaves, Sulu finds the receptionist arguing with the tiffin service guy. She has an idea and requests Maria to give her the tiffin service contract. In the end, Ashok is now managing the tiffin business and Sulu resumes her radio jockey job, managing both the household and her professional life in her own style.

Cast
Vidya Balan as Sulochana "Sulu" Dubey
Manav Kaul as Ashok Dubey, Sulu's husband
Vijay Maurya as Pankaj Rai Baaghi, poet and creator of the late night talk show at the radio station 'Radio Wow'
Neha Dhupia as Maryam "Maria" Sood, Sulu's employer at 'Radio Wow'
RJ Malishka as RJ Albeli Anjali, Sulu's colleague at 'Radio Wow'
Abhishek Sharrma as Pranav, Sulu's son
Ayushmann Khurrana as himself (Special Appearance)
Mahesh Pillai as School Principal 
Sindhu Shekharan as Aradhana, one of Sulu's elder twin sisters
Seema Taneja as Kalpana, the second twin sister
Trupti Khamkar as lady cab driver
Santanu Ghatak as Sanjay, boss of Ashok Dubey 
Uday Lagoo as Sulu's father
Hitesh Dave as grocery shop owner
Shashi Ranjan as Ramesh
Sonel Singh as Girija – Receptionist at the radio station 'Radio Wow'
Vibhavari Deshpande as Constable

Production

Development
The official announcement of the film was made in November 2016.

Filming
The principal photography of the film commenced in Mumbai on 25 April 2017. The team started the shoot by performing a 'puja' which was attended and blessed by the mothers of the producers and director on 21 April 2017.

Soundtrack

The music of the film is composed by Guru Randhawa, Rajat Nagpal, Tanishk Bagchi, Laxmikant–Pyarelal, Amartya Bobo Rahut and Siddhant Kaushal while the lyrics have been penned by Randhawa, Nagpal, Javed Akhtar, Vayu, Siddhant Kaushal and Santanu Ghatak who sang the song "Rafu". The first song of the film "Ban Ja Rani" from Randhawa's 2016 album "Tu Meri Rani" has been recreated for this film and it was released on 16 October 2017. The second song of the film titled as "Hawa Hawai 2.0" from Anil Kapoor's 1987 film Mr. India has also been recreated for this film by music composer Bagchi and it was released on 26 October 2017. The third single to be released was "Manva Likes To Fly" which is sung by Shalmali Kholgade was released on 3 November 2017. The soundtrack was released by T-Series on 4 November 2017.

Awards and nominations

References

External links

Indian comedy-drama films
2010s Hindi-language films
Films scored by Guru Randhawa
Films scored by Laxmikant–Pyarelal
Films scored by Rajat Nagpal
Films set in Mumbai
Films about women in India
2017 directorial debut films
Hindi films remade in other languages
T-Series (company) films